Mikael Johan Lindberg (born 12 January 1993) is a Swedish professional golfer and European Tour player. He won the 2022 Indoor Golf Group Challenge.

Professional career
Lindberg turned professional in 2013 and joined the Nordic Golf League. He recorded his maiden professional victory at the 2016 Trummenäs Open. In 2019 he won the Tour Final in Estonia.

His breakthrough season was 2020 when he won 4 tournaments and topped the Nordic Golf League Order of Merit, to graduate to the Challenge Tour.

On the Challenge Tour he was in contention in his second start, finishing tied for third at the 2021 Bain's Whisky Cape Town Open, one stroke behind J. C. Ritchie and Jacques Blaauw. The finish propelled him to 250th on the Official World Golf Ranking.

In 2022, Lindberg finished third at the Challenge de España, before shooting a closing five under par round of 66 to win the Indoor Golf Group Challenge three strokes ahead of Denmark's Nicolai Tinning, Englishman Steven Tiley and France's Robin Sciot-Siegrist. The following week he was runner-up at the B-NL Challenge Trophy, one stroke behind Alexander Knappe.

Lindberg finished 5th in the 2022 Challenge Tour rankings to graduate to the European Tour for 2023.

Amateur wins
2007 Skandia Tour Distrikt #1 
2009 Skandia Tour Regional #5
2011 Skandia Tour Elit Pojkar #5, Viksjö Junior Open, Junior Masters Invitational, Alex Norén Junior Open	
2012 Stocholm District Championship

Source:

Professional wins (7)

Challenge Tour wins (1)

*Note: The 2022 Indoor Golf Group Challenge was shortened to 54 holes due to rain.

Nordic Golf League wins (5)

Swedish Golf Tour wins (1)

See also
2022 Challenge Tour graduates

References

External links

Swedish male golfers
European Tour golfers
Golfers from Stockholm
1993 births
Living people